Gröbming is a municipality in the district of Liezen in Styria, Austria.

References

Cities and towns in Liezen District